Hari Singh Dilbar (c. 1929 – 3 May 2017) was a well-known Indian Punjabi language writer and poet.

Born around 1929 in Layallpur, British Punjab (present-day Faisalabad, Pakistan) Dilbar has been writing and reciting poems since 1943.

Early life
Dilbar was born as Hari Singh in 1929 in Layallpur (now Faisalabad), British Punjab. After partition they moved to Jalandhar and then shifted to Sirsa (now in Haryana state). He did his schooling up to fifth standard. Dilbar worked in a sweetshop for many year and lived by selling snacks and samosas near the bus stand of Sirsa.

Career
He started writing poetry in 1943. A poet, he published many books on various subjects. With a long journey of reciting satirical poems at the Red Fort Delhi, he had recited his verses before Prime Minister Jawahar Lal Nehru to Narendra Modi, whom he had regaled with his lively satires. He travelled a number of foreign countries ad recent visit was to Australia.

Death
On 3 May 2017, he died of serious attack of diabetics at his residence in Sirsa City. Writers and poets from the state expressed condolence of his demise.

See also
 Surjit Paatar
 Dev Tharike Wala
 Gurbhajan Gill

References

20th-century Indian poets
Punjabi people
Punjabi-language writers
Indian Sikhs
People from Faisalabad
2017 deaths
1920s births
Date of birth missing
Poets from Haryana